Amaechi Muonagor  (born Idemili, Anambra State) is a Nigerian actor and producer. In 2016, he was nominated for AMVCA 2017 Best Actor In a Comedy.

Early life 
Amaechi Muonagor is from Obosi village in Idemili North, Anambra State in Nigeria. He attended St. Mary's Primary School, Obosi, Oraifite Grammar School before he furthered his education at the University of Nigeria, Nsukka (UNN) where he studied economics and graduated in 1987.

Career 
In 1989 after his youth service, Amaechi started working for NAN (News Agency of Nigeria). He left his job a few years later for an acting role in his first movie as Akunatakasi in Taboo 1, a Nigerian movie.

Personal life 
He is married and has four children.

Amaechi, amongst other Nollywood stars like Chinyere Winifred, Ebere Okaro, joined  Dr Chris Eke of Word and Spirit Assembly, Ijegun Lagos as he marked his 40th birthday back in 2015, celebrating it with kikiri maximum prison inmates as well as children at the Hearts of Gold Children's Hospice orphanage home. In 2020, he said sexual harassment is not peculiar to Nollywood as it happens in every profession.

Illness 
In 2016, there were numerous publications on websites that claimed Amaechi was very ill and suffering from diabetes. Since then, Amaechi hasn't appeared or featured in any movie. There have been rumours about him leaving the movie industry.

Filmography 
 Taboo 1 (1989)
 Karishika (1996)
 Igodo (1999)
 Aki na Ukwa (2002)
 His Last Action (2008)
 Sincerity (2009)
 Without Goodbye (2009)
 Most Wanted Kidnappers (2010)
 Jack and Jill (2011)
 Village Rascal (2012)
 Evil World (2015) 
 Ugonma (2015) 
 Code of Silence (2015) 
 Spirits (2016)
 Rosemary (2016)
My Village People (2021)
Aki and Pawpaw

References 

20th-century Nigerian male actors
Living people
Nigerian television personalities
Nigerian male television actors
Male actors from Anambra State
University of Nigeria alumni
Male television personalities
Actors from Anambra State
Igbo people
1962 births